İlhan Depe (born 10 September 1992) is a Turkish footballer who plays for Bucaspor 1928.

Depe has represented various youth teams for the Turkish Football Federation. and scored his first goal for them in a Turkey U18 2-1 victory over Estonia U18.

References

External links

1992 births
Sportspeople from Bursa
Living people
Turkish footballers
Turkey youth international footballers
Association football midfielders
Bursaspor footballers
Şanlıurfaspor footballers
İnegölspor footballers
Balıkesirspor footballers
Kardemir Karabükspor footballers
Kasımpaşa S.K. footballers
Kayserispor footballers
Altay S.K. footballers
Denizlispor footballers
Süper Lig players
TFF First League players
TFF Second League players